VT or Vt may refer to:

Businesses and organizations
 Verlag Technik, a former German publishing house
 VT F.C. (Vospers Thornycroft FC), a UK football club
 VT Group, a British defence company
 Air Tahiti (IATA airline designator VT), a French airline
 Valley Transit (Washington), the public transit service of Walla Walla, Washington
 Valley Transit (Wisconsin), the public transit service of Wisconsin's Fox Cities
 The Vanguard Group, investment company in Pennsylvania
 Versement transport, a French local corporation tax
 National Rail code for UK train operator Virgin Trains West Coast and its successor Avanti West Coast
 Virginia and Truckee Railroad, a short line railroad in Nevada
 Virginia Tech, common name of the Virginia Polytechnic Institute and State University, Blacksburg, Virginia
 VolgaTelecom, Russian telecommunications company
 VT, a news and entertainment platform; see Jungle Creations

Science and technology

Computing
 Ventrilo, a voice-chatting program for gamers
 Vertical tab, ASCII character 11
 Video terminal, a “computer terminal” with a video display
 Video Toaster, a video editing program
 Virtual terminal, an application service
 Intel VT, Intel Virtualization Technology
 Intel VT-i, Intel Virtualization Technology for Itanium
 Intel VT-c, Intel Virtualization Technology for Connectivity
 Intel VT-d, Intel Virtualization Technology for Directed I/O
 Intel VT-x, Intel Virtualization Technology for x86

Other uses in science and technology
 Vanishing twin, a fetus which dies in utero and is partially reabsorbed by its twin
 Ventricular tachycardia, an abnormal heart rhythm
 Holden Commodore (VT), an automobile
 Tau neutrino (ντ), in physics
 Variable timing fuze, a type of proximity fuze
 Videotape, a video recording medium
 Virtual training, a training method in which a simulated virtual environment is used
 Thermal voltage (VT) of a semiconductor p-n junction
 Threshold voltage (Vt) of a MOSFET
 Voltage transformer, in electricity distribution
 Valdôtain tresse, one of the friction hitches used by tree surgeons and other climbers to ascend a rope

Other uses
 Vanuatu vatu, a currency
 VeggieTales, a Christian-themed computer animated children's television show
 Vendange tardive, a French designation for late harvest wines
 Vermont, a U.S. state with postal abbreviation VT
 Vertical Tank, a vehicle in Capcom's Steel Battalion
 Vetus Testamentum, a religious journal
 Victoria Terminus, former name of the Chhatrapati Shivaji Terminus of the Mumbai suburban railway
 Virtualtourist, a tourism related website
 Visiting teaching, a program for members of the LDS Church
 India (aircraft registration prefix VT)
 Transitive verb, in some dictionaries